Pamburus is a genus of flowering plants belonging to the family Rutaceae.

Its native range is India and Sri Lanka.

Species
Species:
 Pamburus missionis (Wall. ex Wight) Swingle

References

Aurantioideae
Aurantioideae genera